Rebecca Garcia (politician), sometimes mis-spelled Rebeca,  is a Brazilian economist and politician.  

Rebeca Garcia may also refer to:
Rebeca Garcia (figure skater), Spanish competitor in the 2002 World Junior Figure Skating Championships
Rebeca Garcia (gymnast), Spanish gymnast in the 2008 Rhythmic Gymnastics European Championships
Rebeca Garcia (swimmer), Mexican competitor in the 1959 Central American and Caribbean Games